Carl Tourenne (born 10 June 1972) is a French former professional association football defensive midfielder, who last played for Championnat de France amateur Group C side Chamois Niortais. From March 2016 to May 2016, he was interim manager of the same club alongside Jean-Philippe Faure.

In the 2001–02 season, Tourenne played two matches in the UEFA Cup with Troyes. He re-signed for his first club, Chamois Niortais, on 29 July 2009.
Tourenne retired from football at the end of the 2010–11 season at the age of 39, having played 548 league matches in his career.

Honours
Lille
Ligue 2: 1999–2000

Troyes
Intertoto Cup: 2001

References

External links

1972 births
Living people
French footballers
Association football midfielders
Chamois Niortais F.C. players
Angoulême Charente FC players
Valenciennes FC players
Lille OSC players
ES Troyes AC players
Stade de Reims players
Amiens SC players
Ligue 1 players
Ligue 2 players
Stade Poitevin FC players
Association football defenders